Daniel Leonard Grieves (born 21 September 1978) is an English former professional footballer.

Club career
Grieves started his career as a trainee with Watford from 1996 to 1999. He made one appearance for Watford, in a 1–0 Football League Trophy loss to Fulham in 1997. In 1999 he moved to Israel to sign for Maccabi Herzliya. He made nine appearances in the Ligat Ha`Al, with no goals, before being released mid-season.

On his return to England, Grieves signed for Queens Park Rangers, but ultimately failed to make an appearances for the West-London club. Following his release, he played for Hemel Hempstead Town for a short period. He then signed for Aylesbury United ahead of the 2003–04 season, and went on to score on his debut. However, after four more appearances, he left the club to join Hemel Hempstead Town. He agreed a deal with Dover Athletic in 2004.

During his playing career, he also played for non-league sides Cambridge United, Thame United, Cheshunt and Folkestone Invicta.

Personal life
Grieves hails from a footballing family, with his brother, Darren, playing the majority of his career in the English lower leagues. His grandfather was Watford and Chelsea half-back Reg Williams, while his great-grandfather was legendary Watford goalkeeper Skilly Williams - with Skilly Williams also being the grandfather of Grieves' cousin, Grant Cornock, who was also in Watford's academy. His nephew, Jack, is also a footballer, and currently also plays for Watford.

Having retired, Grieves ran an executive car service, as of 2014.

Career statistics

Club

Notes

References

1978 births
Living people
Sportspeople from Watford
English footballers
Association football midfielders
Association football forwards
Israeli Premier League players
Isthmian League players
Watford F.C. players
Maccabi Herzliya F.C. players
Cambridge United F.C. players
Queens Park Rangers F.C. players
Hemel Hempstead Town F.C. players
Thame United F.C. players
Aylesbury United F.C. players
Cheshunt F.C. players
Dover Athletic F.C. players
Folkestone Invicta F.C. players
English expatriate footballers
English expatriate sportspeople in Israel
Expatriate footballers in Israel